Värnamo sjukhus ("Värnamo hospital") is a hospital in Värnamo, Sweden. It's one of three hospitals in Jönköping County and serves a population of around 96,000. It employs 1,300 people of which 125 are doctors. When it opened in 1976 it replaced Värnamo lasarett from 1923.

References

External links
  
 1177.se 

Hospital buildings completed in 1976
Hospitals in Sweden
Hospitals established in 1976
1976 establishments in Sweden